Memorials and monuments at Arlington National Cemetery include 28 major and 142 minor monuments and memorials. Arlington National Cemetery is a United States national cemetery located in Arlington County, Virginia, in the United States. It is managed by the United States Army, rather than the United States Department of Veterans Affairs.

The first major memorial in the cemetery was completed in 1866. Entry gates in the cemetery were later dedicated to Union Army generals. The Spanish–American War and World War I led to the construction of several more major memorials. The Tomb of the Unknown Soldier was constructed in 1921, although the large sarcophagus above the burial vault was not dedicated until 1932. Almost a third of the cemetery's major memorials have been constructed since 1983.

Owing to space constraints, Arlington National Cemetery does not permit the construction of large memorials or monuments without an act of Congress. The cemetery does, however, encourage the donation of trees ("living memorials") and permits small memorial plaques to be placed before these plantings. As of 2011, there were 142 such memorial plaques in the cemetery.

Memorials and monuments

Creating Arlington National Cemetery
In 1778, John Parke Custis purchased a  tract of sylvan land on the Potomac River north of the town of Alexandria, Virginia. This land became the Arlington Estate.  In time, his granddaughter, Mary Anna Randolph Custis, inherited the estate. She married Robert E. Lee, an impoverished lieutenant in the United States Army, in June 1831. With the outbreak of the American Civil War on April 12, 1861, Robert E. Lee resigned from the United States Army and took command of Virginia's armed forces on April 23. Mary Custis Lee fled the house on May 17, and Union troops occupied Arlington Estate and Arlington House on May 24.

On July 16, 1862, the United States Congress passed legislation authorizing the purchase of land for national cemeteries for military dead. In May 1864, large numbers of Union forces died in the Battle of the Wilderness, requiring a large new cemetery to be built near the District of Columbia. A study quickly determined that the Arlington Estate was the most suitable property for this purpose. Although the first military burial at Arlington occurred on May 13, 1864, formal authorization for burials did not occur until June 15, 1864.

First memorials and monuments

The first memorials at Arlington National Cemetery were built during and immediately after the Civil War. These first memorials were small, as the federal government (burdened by the cost of the war) expended little money on the cemetery.

The first memorial constructed was the Civil War Unknowns Monument. United States Army Quartermaster General Montgomery C. Meigs ordered the construction of the monument in 1865. The bodies of 2,111 Union and Confederate dead were collected and placed in a vault beneath the monument, which was sealed in September 1866.

In 1867, Congress enacted legislation requiring that all military cemeteries be fenced. Meigs ordered the construction of a red Seneca sandstone wall around the cemetery. The construction of the wall (which would not be complete until 1897) necessitated the construction of gates as well. Construction began on a memorial to Major General George B. McClellan (the McClellan Gate) in 1870, but delays in obtaining high-quality red Seneca sandstone delayed its completion until 1879.

The Spanish–American War of 1898 led to the creation of several new memorials: The Spanish–American War Memorial in 1902, the Spanish–American War Nurses Memorial in 1905, and the Rough Riders Memorial in 1907. Two more major memorials were added prior to World War I:  The Confederate Monument in 1914, and the USS Maine Memorial in 1915.

Another nine memorials, most of them commemorating World War I, were added in the 1920s and 1930s.  This included the Tomb of the Unknown Soldier, which was dedicated on November 11, 1921. The cenotaph above the tomb is a later addition, and was dedicated on November 11, 1932. At the end of World War II, the cemetery had a total of 16 major memorials.  Another 12 major memorials were added after 1949, with eight of these constructed after 1983.

Former memorials and monuments

Several memorials and monuments in Arlington National Cemetery no longer exist. One of the earliest memorials to be built in the cemetery was the Sheridan Gate, named for General Philip Sheridan. The gate was constructed in 1879 of four Ionic columns salvaged from the demolition of the War Department Building (located at the site of the current Eisenhower Executive Office Building). Initially, there was no name inscribed on the gate's pediment, although the last names of Abraham Lincoln, Ulysses S. Grant, Edwin M. Stanton, and Winfield Scott were chiseled into the front of each column. After the death of Sheridan, his last name was added to the pediment and the gate became known as the Sheridan Gate. Another early memorial was the Ord-Weitzel Gate, named for Major General Edward Ord and Major General Godfrey Weitzel. Also completed in 1879, it was constructed from two salvaged War Department Building columns. Like the Sheridan Gate, this gate was initially not dedicated to anyone.  But by 1902, with the passing of both Ord and Weitzel, their names were inscribed into left and right columns of the gate, respectively. Arlington National Cemetery's easternmost boundary had, since 1864, been the Arlington Ridge Road (what is present-day Eisenhower Drive).  In 1971, the cemetery expanded eastward to its present boundary (the Jefferson Davis Highway). At that time, the Sheridan and Ord-Weitzel gates were dismantled and the columns, marble pediments, and iron gates put into outdoor storage. Unfortunately, both gates were severely damaged during their dismantling.  They were further damaged by inappropriate outdoor storage, and have been heavily vandalized.

In 1884, a Temple of Fame was erected in the center of the flower garden on the south side of Arlington House. The U.S. Patent Office building had suffered a fire in 1877, and it was torn down and rebuilt in 1879. In 1884, stone columns, pediments, and entablatures from this demolition were used to construct the Temple of Fame. The Temple was a round, Greek Revival, temple-like structure with Doric columns supporting a central dome. Inscribed on the pediment supporting the dome were the last names of great Americans such as George Washington, Ulysses S. Grant, Abraham Lincoln, and David Farragut. A year after it was built, the last names of several Union Civil War generals (such as George Meade, James B. McPherson, and James A. Garfield) were carved into the columns. Since there wasn't enough marble to rebuild the dome, a tin dome (molded and painted to look like marble) was installed instead. The Temple of Fame was demolished in 1967.

New memorials and monuments
In 1960, the United States Congress enacted "The Act of 2 September 1960" (74 Stat; 24 U.S.C. 295a).  As codified in Title 32 of the Code of Federal Regulations, Part 553, a concurrent or joint resolution of Congress is needed before any new memorial or monument may be placed at Arlington. This requirement does not apply to group burials, for which an aboveground marker may be erected without congressional approval.

The rules were relaxed somewhat in 2012. On August 6, 2012, Congress enacted the "Honoring America's Veterans and Caring for Camp Lejeune Families Act of 2012" (P.L. 112–154; 126 Stat. 1165). Title VI, Section 604 of this legislation permits the Secretary of the Army to establish regulations for the erection at Arlington National Cemetery of memorials or monuments to an individual or military event if 25 years have passed. Such monuments may be placed only in areas designated by the Secretary of the Army, and must be paid for entirely by private donations. All alternative locations to Arlington National Cemetery must be ruled out, and the United States Commission of Fine Arts must be consulted on the memorial's appropriateness. The 25-year requirement may be waived if the event or service is ongoing, or if a "manifest injustice" would occur. In such cases, Congress may override the waiver by joint resolution within 60 days.

In 2012, legislation began moving through Congress to approve a "Place of Remembrance" at Arlington National Cemetery. The memorial will be an ossuary designed to contain fragments of remains which are unidentifiable through DNA analysis. The legislation required that these remains be cremated before placement in the memorial. Cemetery officials said that Arlington National Cemetery has no means of receiving and burying these remains, and placing them in the Tomb of the Unknowns would be inappropriate. The legislation leaves the design and placement of the memorial up to cemetery officials. On September 18, 2012, the House of Representatives approved the memorial, sending the legislation to the Senate. This legislation was not acted on by the Senate, and died at the end of the 112th United States Congress.

In May 2014, Arlington National Cemetery officials renamed the Old Amphitheater, rededicating it as the James R. Tanner Memorial Amphitheater. Tanner, a Union Army veteran, lost both legs during the American Civil War. He became a stenographer and clerk with the War Department, and took down most of the eyewitness testimony during the early hours of the investigation into the assassination of Abraham Lincoln.  Tanner is buried a few yards from the amphitheater.

List of major memorials and monuments

Below is a list of the major memorials and monuments in the cemetery.

List of minor memorials and monuments

The U.S. Army has statutory authority to manage Arlington National Cemetery under the National Cemetery Act, as amended. Under regulations issued in Title 32, Section 553.22 of the Code of Federal Regulations, the Army established a mechanism for proposing and building minor memorials at Arlington National Cemetery without requiring an act of Congress. Appendix A to Section 553 ("Specifications for Tributes in Arlington National Cemetery") lays out the specific form these minor memorials may take. Wording must be dignified, and the Superintendent of Arlington National Cemetery has sole and unlimited authority to accept or reject the plaque's design and wording.

A short time prior to 2014, Arlington National Cemetery discontinued the practice of allowing memorial trees, accompanied by plaques, to be placed in the cemetery.

Below is a list of the minor memorials and monuments in the cemetery.

Nearby memorials and monuments

Several memorials and monuments are immediately adjacent to Arlington National Cemetery. These are often mistakenly assumed to be part of the cemetery, but are not.  These include:
 Netherlands Carillon – First erected in 1954, it was moved to its present location north of the cemetery in 1960.
 Women in Military Service for America Memorial – Opened in 1997, this memorial was on the grounds of the George Washington Memorial Parkway. Although the memorial appears to be part of the ceremonial entrance to Arlington National Cemetery, it was not until the NDAA 2020 was approved on December 20, 2019, that the land was transferred from the National Park Service to the Army. Now, Memorial Drive and the Hemicycle (the front wall) of the Women In Military Service For America Memorial are located on land that is part of Arlington National Cemetery.

Memorial Avenue
A number of public improvements and memorials were planned for construction in the Washington, D.C., metropolitan area for the 1932 bicentennial of the birth of George Washington, the first President of the United States and American Revolutionary War hero. Among these were Arlington Memorial Bridge and the Mount Vernon Memorial Parkway (now known as the George Washington Memorial Parkway). To link the Virginia landing of the bridge with Arlington National Cemetery, a wide avenue known as Memorial Avenue was constructed and a new entrance to the cemetery (the Hemicycle) constructed.

Memorial Avenue is part of the George Washington Memorial Parkway. The roadway was formally transferred from the U.S. Army to the Department of the Interior in October 1940. The memorials and monuments which line Memorial Avenue are often believed to be part of Arlington National Cemetery, but are not. The memorials and monuments on Memorial Avenue include (as of 2012):
 101st Airborne Division Memorial
 4th Infantry (Ivy) Division Memorial
 Armored Forces Memorial
 The Hiker, the Spanish–American War Veterans Memorial
 Seabees Memorial
 Rear Admiral Richard E. Byrd, Jr. Memorial

References
Notes footnote 60
Tree #78, Section 13: Army Air Forces Orchestra (Glenn Miller) - American Holly

Memorial Trees Updated May 9, 2014.pdf

https://www.arlingtoncemetery.mil/Portals/0/Docs/Memorial%20Trees%20Updated%209-5-2014.pdf?ver=2020-08-27-190631-920

Citations

Bibliography
 Andrews, Owen and Davidson, Cameron. A Moment of Silence: Arlington National Cemetery. Indianapolis, Ind.: Wiley, 1994.
 Atkinson, Rick. Where Valor Rests: Arlington National Cemetery. Washington, D.C.: National Geographic, 2009. 
 Bigler, Philip. In Honored Glory: Arlington National Cemetery, the Final Post. Arlington, Va.: Vandamere Press, 1999.
 Chase, Enoch Aquila. "The Arlington Case: George Washington Custis Lee against the United States of America." Records of the Columbia Historical Society. 31/32: 1930.
 Cultural Landscape Program. Arlington House: The Robert E. Lee Memorial Cultural Landscape Report. National Capital Region. National Park Service. U.S. Department of the Interior. Washington, D.C.: 2001.
 Decker, Karl, and McSween, Angus. Historic Arlington. Washington, D.C.: Decker and McSween Publishing Company, 1892.
 Dodge, George W. Arlington National Cemetery. Charleston, S.C.: Arcadia Publishing, 2006.
 Goode, James M. Capital Losses: A Cultural History of Washington's Destroyed Buildings. 2d ed. Washington, D.C.: Smithsonian Institution Press, 2003. 
 Historic American Buildings Survey. Arlington National Cemetery, Ord-Weitzel Gate. HABS VA-1348-C. National Park Service. U.S. Department of the Interior. 1999. Accessed 2012-07-15.
 Historic American Buildings Survey. Arlington National Cemetery, Sheridan Gate. HABS VA-1348-B. National Park Service. U.S. Department of the Interior. 1999. Accessed 2012-07-15.
 Holt, Dean W. American Military Cemeteries. Jefferson, N.C.: McFarland & Co., 2010.
 Hughes, Nathaniel Cheairs and Ware, Thomas Clayton. Theodore O'Hara: Poet-Soldier of the Old South. Knoxville, Tenn.: University of Tennessee Press, 1998.
 McCaslin, Richard B. Lee in the Shadow of Washington. Baton Rouge: Louisiana State University Press, 2004.
 Peters, James Edward. Arlington National Cemetery, Shrine to America's Heroes. Bethesda, Md.: Woodbine House, 2000.
 Polk, David. History of the Third Infantry Division. Paducah, Ky.: Turner Publishing Co., 1994.
 Poole, Robert M. On Hallowed Ground: The Story of Arlington National Cemetery. New York: Walker & Co., 2009.
 Silber, Nina. Landmarks of the Civil War. New York: Oxford University Press, 2003.
 United States Commission of Fine Arts. Tenth Report. Washington, D.C.: U.S. Government Printing Office, 1926.

External links

 

Arlington
Arlington National Cemetery List
Arlington National Cemetery List
Arlington National Cemetery
Arlington National Cemetery List
Arlington National Cemetery List
Arlington National Cemetery List